Trichopeltina is a genus of fungi in the Trichopeltinaceae family; according to the 2007 Outline of Ascomycota, the placement in this family is uncertain.

Species
As accepted by Species Fungorum;
 Trichopeltina asiatica 
 Trichopeltina chilensis 
 Trichopeltina exporrecta 
 Trichopeltina ixorae 
 Trichopeltina labecula

References

External links
Index Fungorum

Dothideomycetes genera